Nicole Sarauer is a Canadian politician, who was elected to the Legislative Assembly of Saskatchewan in the 2016 provincial election. She represents the electoral district of Regina Douglas Park as a member of the Saskatchewan New Democratic Party.  On June 20, 2017, she was selected to succeed Trent Wotherspoon as Leader of the Opposition and interim leader of the Saskatchewan New Democratic Party.

Education
Having attended high school in Regina, Nicole Sarauer studied at the University of Regina from 2004 to 2006. In 2009 she graduated with Honours from the College of Law at the University of Saskatchewan, earning a Juris Doctor.

Career
After finishing her studies, Sarauer worked at the law firm Kanuka Thuringer LLP as an Associate. In 2011 she became a lawyer at Pro Bono Law Saskatchewan, providing legal representation free of charge. She was also elected School Board Trustee of the Regina Catholic School Division in 2012.

Since being elected in 2016, she has served as the Critic for Justice and Policing & Corrections in the opposition NDP caucus. Additionally, she recently has had the portfolios of the Provincial Capital Commission (including Wascana Park) and the Saskatchewan Liquor and Gaming Commission (which now includes the cannabis file).

Aside from her stint as Leader of the Opposition, Sarauer has served under Ryan Meili's leadership as both Opposition House Leader and, presently, as the Deputy Leader of the Opposition and Saskatchewan NDP.

Electoral record

References



Living people
Saskatchewan New Democratic Party MLAs
Women MLAs in Saskatchewan
Politicians from Regina, Saskatchewan
21st-century Canadian politicians
21st-century Canadian women politicians
Female Canadian political party leaders
Leaders of the Saskatchewan CCF/NDP
Year of birth missing (living people)